The twelfth series of British talent competition programme Britain's Got Talent was broadcast on ITV, from 14 April to 3 June 2018. For this series, the live episodes were broadcast from Hammersmith Apollo, and presented by Dec Donnelly only; while Ant McPartlin suspended his TV commitments on 19 March 2018, he still appeared in the audition episodes as these had already been filmed in January and February earlier that year. Compared to previous years, this series featured a higher number of participants for the judges to select semi-finalists from, not counting those who received the Golden Buzzer, and saw the return of the Judges' Vote to the show's format.

The twelfth series was won by stand-up comedian Lost Voice Guy and finishing in first place and comic singer & pianist Robert White finishing in second place. During its broadcast, the series averaged 8.34 million viewers.

Series overview
Open auditions were held the previous year between October to December, before the Judges' auditions took place between January and February 2018, within the cities of Blackpool, London and Manchester. This series is notable for the absence of Anthony McPartlin in the live episodes, after he stepped down from his TV commitments in the aftermath of a traffic accident on 18 March 2018 that he was involved in. While McPartlin still appeared during audition episodes on both Britain's Got Talent and Britain's Got More Talent, as these had already been filmed prior to the start of the series' broadcast, his colleague Declan Donnelly chose to present the live episodes without him, in the wake of his colleague's decision.

This series saw a far higher number of participants making it through the first stage of auditions, than had been recorded in previous years - in addition to those receiving the Golden Buzzer, around 182 acts successfully reached the second stage. Following the eleventh series, the judges' vote was brought back for the semi-finals, after Cowell admitted in June 2017 that he disliked its removal from the show's format. Disruptions caused by bad weather resulted in the first live semi-final being taken off the air for a brief time, following the first performance, while a stage invader attempted to disrupt proceedings during the broadcast of the second live semi-final.

Of the participants that took part, only forty made it into the five live semi-finals - of these acts, reggae singer Donchez Dacres, opera singer Gruffydd Wyn Roberts, singer-guitarists duo Jack & Tim, singer Lifford Shillingford, and magician Marc Spelmann, each received a golden buzzer during their auditions - with eight appearing in each one, and eleven of these acts making it into the live final; the wildcard act chosen by the judges was B Positive Choir, after they lost out in the tied Judges' vote in the second semi-final. The following below lists the results of each participant's overall performance in this series:

 |  |  | 
 Judges' Wildcard Finalist |  Golden Buzzer Audition

  Ages denoted for a participant(s), pertain to their final performance for this series.
  Each respective participant(s) auditioned under a different name, before changing them for their semi-final appearance.
  Locations for members of each respective group, or the group as a whole, were not disclosed during their time on the programme.

Semi-finals summary
 Buzzed out |  Judges' vote | 
 |  |

Semi-final 1 (28 May)
Guest Performers, Results Show: Diversity, and cast of Matilda the Musical

  For health and safety reasons, Matt Johnson's semi-final performance required paramedics to be brought in as a precaution.

Semi-final 2 (29 May)
Guest Performer, Results Show: Alfie Boe

  B Positive Choir were later sent through to the final as the judges' wildcard.

Semi-final 3 (30 May)
Guest Performer, Results Show: Rita Ora

Semi-final 4 (31 May)
Guest Performers, Results Show: Cast of Chicago

 For health and safety reasons, Sascha William's semi-final performance required fire extinguishers to be on standby as a precaution.

Semi-final 5 (1 June)
Guest Performer, Results Show: Tokio Myers

Final (3 June)
Guest Performers, Results Show: Cast of Tina: The Musical, and cast of Magic Mike Live

 |

Ratings

Criticism
Viewers criticised BGTs twelfth series over two separate matters. The first concerned one of the golden buzzers conducted in the auditions for the twelfth series for singer Lifford Shillingford as being a "fix". Viewers complained on social media that he maintained a close connection to judge Alesha Dixon, who provided the buzzer, and thus had an unfair advantage over other participants. Both Dixon and Shillingford denied the allegations, which focused on comments made by the judge over the singer's performance, clarifying that while they knew each other, it was through their mutual work in the music industry and not from a close friendship.

The second concerned the guest performance by the cast members of the musical Magic Mike for the live final. The complaint centered around the suitability of the performance for a "family-based show", including the nature of the performers' routines and the overall tone of the performance. In response, the broadcaster refuted the allegations against the guest performers involvement, making clear that the content had been checked thoroughly to ensure it was suitable for young viewers and had met strict "compliance guidelines".

References

2018 British television seasons
Britain's Got Talent